Miguel Ángel Jiménez Godínez (born 10 June 1966) is a Mexican politician from the New Alliance Party. From 2006 to 2009 he served as Deputy of the LX Legislature of the Mexican Congress representing the Federal District.

References

1966 births
Living people
Politicians from Mexico City
New Alliance Party (Mexico) politicians
21st-century Mexican politicians
Deputies of the LX Legislature of Mexico
Members of the Chamber of Deputies (Mexico) for Mexico City